In economics, a price support may be either a subsidy, a production quota, or a price control, each with the intended effect of keeping the market price of a good higher than the competitive equilibrium level.

In the case of a price control, a price support is the minimum legal price a seller may charge, typically placed above equilibrium. It is the support of certain price levels at or above market values by the government.

A price support scheme can also be an agreement set in order by the government, where the government agrees to purchase the surplus of at a minimum price.  For example, if a price floor were set in place for agricultural wheat commodities, the government would be forced to purchase the resulting surplus from the wheat farmers (thereby subsidizing the farmers) and store or otherwise dispose of it.

Short-term effects

Example 
In a hypothetical market in which supply and demand are such that the equilibrium price and quantity are $5 and 500 units, respectively, and the government then institutes a price floor at $6 per unit:

The benefit to producers of the price support is equal to the gain in producer surplus (represented in blue).
1800 - 1250 = $550

The cost to consumers of the price support is equal to the loss in consumer surplus (represented in red).
1250 - 800 = $450

The cost to the government of the price support is equal to the cost of the surplus in the market (represented in gray).
6 * 200 = $1200

However, since the consumers ultimately pay taxes for the government to purchase the surplus, the total cost to consumers (in the short run) of the price support is the sum of the loss in consumer surplus and the cost of the government purchasing the surplus off the market.
450 + 1200 = $1650

In other words, consumers are paying $1650 in order to benefit producers $550 so price supports are considered inefficient.

The deadweight loss is the efficiency lost by implementing the price-support system. It is the change in Total Surplus and includes the value of the government purchase, and is equal to $1100.

See also

 Direct and Counter-Cyclical Program

References

Price controls
Pricing
Subsidies